Peter Edward Costello (June 27, 1854 – October 23, 1935) was a Republican member of the United States House of Representatives for Pennsylvania.

Peter Costello was born in Boston.  He moved to Philadelphia in 1877.  He engaged in various manufacturing industries and general construction work and real estate development.  He was a member of the common council of Philadelphia from 1895 to 1903, and director of the department of public works of Philadelphia from 1903 to 1905.

He was described by Rudolph Blankenburg as having been dismissed for serving the interests of "the organization" (organized crime).

He was again a member of the common council from 1908 to 1915.

He was elected as a Republican to the Sixty-fourth, Sixty-fifth, and Sixty-sixth Congresses.  He was not a candidate for renomination in 1920.  Costello continued in the real-estate and investment brokerage business in Philadelphia until his death.

References and sources

Philadelphia City Council members
1854 births
1935 deaths
Burials at West Laurel Hill Cemetery
Republican Party members of the United States House of Representatives from Pennsylvania